Suislepa Airfield (also given as Tõrva, Torva and Torva North) is a former air base in Estonia located in the village of Suislepa,  north of Tõrva.  It is an abandoned front-line or maritime bomber base that was mainly used in the 1960s.  Some remains of runways and taxiways can be seen on Google Earth satellite imagery.

References

RussianAirFields.com

Defunct airports in Estonia
Soviet Air Force bases
Viljandi Parish
Buildings and structures in Viljandi County